The 2016 NCAA National Collegiate Women's Ice Hockey Tournament involved eight schools in single-elimination play to determine the national champion of women's NCAA Division I college ice hockey. The quarterfinals were contested at the campuses of the seeded teams on March 12, 2016. The Frozen Four was played on March 18 and 20, 2016 at Whittemore Center Arena in Durham, New Hampshire with the University of New Hampshire as the host.

Qualifying teams 
In the second year under this qualification format, the winners of all four Division I conference tournaments received automatic berths to the NCAA tournament. The other four teams were selected at-large. The top four teams were then seeded and received home ice for the quarterfinals.

Bracket 
Quarterfinals held at home sites of seeded teams

Note: * denotes overtime period(s)

Results

National Quarterfinals

(1) Boston College vs. Northeastern

(4) Quinnipiac vs. Clarkson

(2) Wisconsin vs. Mercyhurst

(3) Minnesota vs. Princeton

National Semifinals

(1) Boston College vs. Clarkson

(2) Wisconsin vs. (3) Minnesota

National Championship

(1) Boston College vs. (3) Minnesota

See also 
2016 NCAA Division I Men's Ice Hockey Tournament

References 

NCAA Women's Ice Hockey Tournament
1
2016 in sports in New Hampshire